Lake Stay may refer to:

Cities, towns, townships etc.
Lake Stay Township, a township Lincoln County, Minnesota

Lakes
Lake Stay (Minnesota), a lake in Lincoln County, Minnesota